Vismayathumbathu is a 2004 Indian Malayalam-language psychological thriller film written, directed and produced by Fazil. It stars Mohanlal, Mukesh, and Nayanthara. Mohanlal plays Sreekumar, who possess sixth sense, while Nayanthara does the role of a wandering spirit who get associated with Sreekumar.

Synopsis
Drawn by an invisible force, Sreekumar meets his school-time friend, Govindan Kutty. That's where he meets with a girl, Rita Mathews, whom he initially mistakes to be a prostitute. Later he discovers that she is the spirit of a Medical College student who had disappeared a while ago. Sreekumar is the only one who is able to see her. Initially, his friends are apprehensive about him, but slowly begin to believe him. Finally, Sreekumar, the spirit and his friends collaborate to unravel the mystery behind the disappeared girl.

Cast

 Mohanlal as Sreekumar
 Mukesh as Govindan Kutty
 Nayanthara as Reetha Mathews
 Harisree Ashokan as Gopan
 Salim Kumar as Guhan
 Nedumudi Venu as Dr. Sibi Joseph
 Cochin Haneefa as C.I. Nandakumar
 K. B. Ganesh Kumar as Dr. Simon Mathew, Reetha's professor
 Kaviyoor Ponnamma as Sreekumar's mother
 Sukumari as Hostel Warden
 Rizabawa as V. B. Prathapan
 Kalpana as Maya
 Lakshmi Krishnamoorthy as Sreekumar's grandmother
 T. P. Madhavan
 Mithra Kurian as Sarala Menon, Reetha's friend
 Abu Salim as Inspector Ravi
 Jijoy Rajagopal as Zachariah Jacob

Reception
Sify wrote: "Stunning! is the word for Fazil's new psychological thriller Vismayathumbathu [...] The film has a solid story, great acting and a surprise climax that not even a jaded critic like yours truly saw coming. Fazil has made it believable; despite the heights you have to take your mind to believe the story premise". Also, "Fazil's control over the medium is outstanding. The meticulous and carefully written screenplay accelerates towards the climax which is absorbing and spell-binding. Only after the film's chilling conclusion will you be able to fit the pieces of this ingenious super natural puzzle together". They conclude by writing: "Vismayathumbathu is an audacious mind game that is simply unmissable." The film despite receiving mixed to positive reviews was a flop at the box office.

Soundtrack
Music: Ouseppachan, Lyrics: Kaithapram Damodaran Namboothiri

 "Priyane Nee Enne" - K. J. Yesudas
 "Etho Kaliyarangin" - Ganga
 "Etho Kaliyarangin" (Extended) - Ganga
 "Etho Kaliyarangin" (Nayika Nee) - Version I - Dr. Fahad Mohammad, Ganga
 "Etho Kaliyarangin" (Nayika Nee) - Version II - Afsal, Ganga
 "Konchi Konchi" - K. J. Yesudas Raga: Kapi (raga)
 "Mizhikalkkinnenthu Velicham" (D) - Vijay Yesudas, Sujatha Mohan
 "Mizhikalkkinnenthu Velicham" (M) - Vijay Yesudas
 "Priyane Nee Enne" - Sujatha Mohan

Remake
Fazil planned to remake the film in Tamil if it was a success. The film was unofficially remade in Tamil as Aavi Kumar (2015).

References

External links 
 

2004 films
2000s Malayalam-language films
2004 psychological thriller films
Malayalam films remade in other languages
Indian psychological thriller films
Films scored by Ouseppachan